Huadian Power International Corporation, formerly Shandong International Power Development Company Limited, is the largest power producer in Shandong Province, China, and is the Hong Kong listed subsidiary of China Huadian, one of the five largest power producers in China. The parent company produces about 10% of China's power, and the subsidiary produces approximately another 5%.

It is headquartered in Jinan, Shandong. It is engaged in the construction and operation of power plants and  power generation.

H shares and A shares of the company were listed on the Hong Kong Stock Exchange and Shanghai Stock Exchange in 1999 and 2005 respectively.

External links

Huadian Power International Corporation

Electric power companies of China
Government-owned companies of China
Companies based in Jinan
Energy companies established in 1994
H shares
Companies listed on the Hong Kong Stock Exchange
Companies listed on the Shanghai Stock Exchange
Chinese companies established in 1994